Wendy Berry Mendes is the Sarlo/Ekman Professor of Emotion at University of California, San Francisco, United States. She was previously the John L. Loeb Associate Professor of Social Sciences at Harvard University.  Her expertise is in the area of emotion, intergroup relationships, stigma and psychophysiology. At UCSF she is the founder and director of the Emotion, Health, and Psychophysiology Lab in the Department of Psychiatry.

Education
Mendes received her bachelor's and master's degrees from California State University, Long Beach.  She then received her Ph.D. in psychology from the University of California, Santa Barbara in 2003 and for two years she was a post-doctoral scholar at the University of California, San Francisco.

Employment and publications
Mendes joined the faculty of Harvard in 2004 as an Assistant Professor of Psychology and was promoted to Associate Professor in 2008. She was a core faculty member of the Robert Wood Johnson Health and Society Scholars program which is run by the Harvard School of Public Health. In 2010 she accepted her current position at UC San Francisco. Her named chair is endowed by George Sarlo in honor of Paul Ekman's career contributions to the study of human emotion.

Mendes co-wrote the book Social Psychophysiology for Social and Personality Psychology (Blascovich, Mendes, Vanman & Dickerson, 2011).
She has published articles in Journal of Personality and Social Psychology, Psychological Science, Psychosomatic Medicine (journal), Emotion (journal), American Journal of Public Health, Clinical Psychological Science, Social Psychological and Personality Science and many other scholarly peer-review journals. Her research questions sit at the intersection of social, personality, and biological psychology and primarily concern embodiment - how emotions, thoughts, and intentions are experienced in the body and how bodily responses shape and influence thoughts, behavior and emotions (see Blascovich & Mendes, 2010). Some current research areas include coping with stigma and discrimination, dyadic intergroup interactions, affect contagion, mind-body relations across the life course, influence of emotional labeling on emotional experience

Awards
In 2008 Mendes won the Gordon Allport prize for best paper on intergroup relations from SPSSI, in 2009 she won the Sage Young Scholar Award awarded by the Society for Personality and Social Psychology, in 2011 she won the Janet Taylor Spence award from APS for early transformative careers awarded by the Association for Psychological Science, in 2020 she was awarded the Career Trajectory Award by the Society for Experimental Social Psychology, and for five consecutive years (2006–2010) she was named one of Harvard undergraduates favorite Professors.

Personal life
Mendes (then Wendy Berry) was Miss California in 1989. She is married to Michael Mendes and they have one daughter, Blair. </ref>

References

External links
Mendes' Professional bio
Mendes' curriculum vitae

American women psychologists
American social psychologists
California State University, Long Beach alumni
University of California, Santa Barbara alumni
University of California, San Francisco alumni
Harvard University faculty
University of California, San Francisco faculty
Miss America 1990 delegates
Living people
Year of birth missing (living people)
American women academics
21st-century American women